Music of My Mind is the fourteenth studio album by American soul musician Stevie Wonder. It was released on March 3, 1972, by Tamla Records, and was Wonder's first to be recorded under a new contract with Motown that allowed him full artistic control over his music. For the album, Wonder recruited electronic music pioneers Malcolm Cecil and Robert Margouleff as associate producers, employing their custom TONTO synthesizer on several tracks. The album was a modest commercial success, but critics found it representative of Wonder's artistic growth, and it is generally considered by modern critics to be the first album of Wonder's classic period.

Recording
Wonder became interested in using synthesizers after hearing the music of electronic group Tonto's Expanding Head Band. Inspired after a meeting with the group's members, Malcolm Cecil and Robert Margouleff, in May 1971, he began utilizing Arp and Moog synthesizers, stating that "the synthesizer has allowed me to do a lot of things I've wanted to do for a long time but were not possible till it came along." Margouleff and Cecil associate produced, engineered, and handled Moog programming for the album, and would go on to collaborate with Wonder on his next three albums. Wonder produced the album and played all of the instruments himself, except for the trombone on "Love Having You Around", which was played by Art Baron, and the guitar on "Superwoman", which was played by Howard "Buzz" Feiten.

Release and reception

When Music of My Mind was first released on March 3, 1972, it became a modest success with both black and white audiences in the United States, charting at number six and number 21 on the Billboard R&B and pop charts, respectively. Contemporary critics viewed it as Wonder's final step into artistic maturity. In Rolling Stone, Vince Aletti said it showcased the ambitious use of Wonder's newfound artistic control and maturity as a songwriter, although he found some of the studio and vocal effects both gimmicky and self-indulgent. Robert Christgau of Creem believed that, like Ray Charles, Wonder transcended aesthetic sensibilities on Music of My Mind, which he said featured "some of the most musical synthesizer improvisations yet", but whose individual songs were not as impressive as the "one-man album" concept.  Cash Box particularly praised the Moog synthesizer work on the single "Keep on Running." Penny Valentine was more enthusiastic in her review for Sounds, viewing the record as a milestone in modern music and a culmination of soul music's creative maturity. She especially praised Wonder's arrangement of "intriguing vocal patterns" on what she deemed "an album of explosive genius and unshackled self-expression".

The album was voted number 645 in the third edition of Colin Larkin's All Time Top 1000 Albums (2000). In 2003, Rolling Stone ranked it number 284 on the magazine's list of the 500 greatest albums of all time; it was number 285 on the 2012 version of the list, and 350 on the 2020 edition.

In 2008, the album was re-released in the UK to coincide with Wonder's European tour.

The songs "Sweet Little Girl" and "Evil" feature prominently at the beginning and end of "Teddy Perkins", the sixth episode of the second season of the acclaimed FX television show Atlanta.

Track listing

Personnel
Stevie Wonder – lead vocals (all), background vocals (1–5, 8), drums (all but 5), handclaps (8), T.O.N.T.O. synthesizer (2, 6, 7, 9), piano (8, 9), Rhodes piano (1–4), talk box (1, 6), harmonica (4, 6), bongos (3), clavinet (5, 8), Moog bass (all)
Art Baron – trombone (1)
Buzz Feiten – electric guitar (2)
Malcolm Cecil – Moog programming, associate producer, engineering
Robert Margouleff – Moog programming, associate producer, engineering
Syreeta – background vocals (4)
Uncredited – background vocals (1, 8, 9)
Joan DeCola – recording
Rick Rowe – recording

Charting singles

Charts

Weekly charts

Year-end charts

References

External links 
 

Stevie Wonder albums
1972 albums
Albums recorded at Electric Lady Studios
Tamla Records albums
Albums produced by Stevie Wonder
Albums produced by Malcolm Cecil